Wheeleria phlomidis is a moth of the family Pterophoridae. It is found in southern and central Russia, Asia Minor, Iran, Syria, Jordan, the Palestinian Territories and Greece.

The larvae feed on Phlomis species (including Phlomis orientalis).

References

Moths described in 1870
Pterophorini
Moths of Europe
Moths of the Middle East
Insects of Turkey